Delaware Township is the name of some places in the U.S. state of Pennsylvania:
Delaware Township, Juniata County, Pennsylvania
Delaware Township, Mercer County, Pennsylvania
Delaware Township, Northumberland County, Pennsylvania
Delaware Township, Pike County, Pennsylvania
Delaware Township, Philadelphia County, Pennsylvania, defunct

Pennsylvania township disambiguation pages